Roussan Camille (27 August 1912 – 7 December 1961) was a Haitian poet, journalist, and diplomat.

Biography
Born in Jacmel, he was educated at the Christian Brothers' School, the Lycée Pinchinat of Jacmel and the Tippenhauer College in Port-au-Prince. Under Charles Moravia's directorship, he began a career as a journalist, publishing articles, poems and the column "Bel aujourd'hui" under his pen-name Nassour El Limac, in Haiti-Journal, Temps-Revue and L'Action nationale. He became director of Haiti-Journal after Moravia's death in 1938.

Camille entered public service, and was appointed to several diplomatic functions, including secretary of the Haitian legation to Paris and Haitian vice-consul in New York City, and then returned home to become secretary general in the ministry of health.

His best known work is Assaut à la Nuit (Port-au-Prince: Impr. de l'Etat, 1940). He was awarded the Dumarsais Estimé poetry prize for his collection Multiple Présence (Quebec: Editions Naaman, 1978).

Awards
 1961 Price Dumarsais Estimé.
 2004 Henri Deschamps Literary Award (posthumous).

References

Notes

Further reading
 F. Raphaël Berrou and Pradel Pompilus, Histoire de la littérature haïtienne illustrée par les textes, vol. 3 (1977), 237–252.

1912 births
1961 deaths
20th-century Haitian poets
20th-century journalists
20th-century male writers
Haitian diplomats
Haitian journalists
Haitian male poets
People from Jacmel